Fredrik Pallesen Knudsen (born 30 August 1996) is a Norwegian footballer who plays for Brann.

He started his youth career in the Møhlenpris neighborhood club SK Djerv, and also played for its senior team in the 4. divisjon. Joining SK Brann's junior ranks in 2012, he finished his junior career as captain of the Brann team that won the 2014 Norwegian Junior Cup. Among his teammates who later became professional were Ådne Nissestad, Markus Olsen Pettersen, Emil Hansson, Joachim Soltvedt and Håkon Lorentzen. The next year he made his debut as a Norway youth international.

Career statistics

Club

References

1996 births
Living people
Norwegian footballers
Norway youth international footballers
Norway under-21 international footballers
SK Brann players
Åsane Fotball players
FK Haugesund players
Norwegian First Division players
Eliteserien players
Association football defenders
Footballers from Bergen